Holocaust is a fictional character appearing in American comic books published by Marvel Comics. The character first appeared in X-Men Alpha (February 1995), and was created by Scott Lobdell and Roger Cruz; however, a character with the same name and similar appearance (without armor) was featured in Stryfe's Strike Files (January 1993), two years before X-Men Alpha was released (the information on Holocaust in Stryfe's Strike Files seems to support an understanding that both versions of the character are one and the same).

Fictional character biography

The Age of Apocalypse
The character of Nemesis, originally known as Holocaust, is the purported son of Apocalypse and serves as one of his father's Four Horsemen in the Age of Apocalypse timeline. The first assignment that Apocalypse passes onto Holocaust requires the latter to spy on the X-Men in order to launch an attack on the group when the opportunity arises. Nemesis gleefully turned his powers on the mountain retreat, causing devastation among Magneto's younger students while the Master of Magnetism and his X-Men were engaged with Apocalypse in the States. Resistance came only from Magneto's daughter, the Scarlet Witch, and Rogue, the X-Men's latest recruit. Nemesis was cocky and assured of his own invincibility, but Wanda's probability-altering hexes injured even his toughened skin, marking her as a threat. In the struggle that followed, Rogue got most of the younger students to safety, but Nemesis brutally murdered the Scarlet Witch after a prolonged battle, leaving her for Magneto to find when he returned.

During Apocalypse's blitzkrieg against Europe and Asia, Nemesis joins Apocalypse in Japan. The Horseman slaughter thousands of humans in Apocalypse's name and capture Sunfire. However, before they can kill Sunfire, the captured figure unleashes a nuclear-level plasma blast; Nemesis absorbs the blast, saving both himself and Apocalypse. After Apocalypse retreats to recuperate, Nemesis, now charged with Sunfire's energies, is left to attend to Japan. During his time in Japan, a small squad of X-Men attacks Nemesis and, using Sunfire's energy, Nemesis is ready to destroy Quicksilver, but Magneto—a character that is still enraged by the death of students and his daughter at the hands of Nemesis—uses his powers to strip away most of Nemesis' flesh before the attack on Quicksilver can occur. The X-Men then retreat, many of them injured, and leave Nemesis to die.

However, the burnt corpse of Nemesis is still alive and he is eventually recovered by Apocalypse. Nemesis awakes in the labs of the Dark Beast where his spiritual essence is fitted with a near-indestructible crystalline exo-armor—the fitting is not only capable of channelling his energy, but also contains him, preventing the character from dissipating. This procedure signifies the birth of Holocaust and the character eventually reassumes his position as a Horseman of Apocalypse, after absorbing the life essence of Candra, where the character becomes a mainstay.

Later Holocaust attempts to slay Magneto but is stopped by the intervention of Nate Grey. The subsequent battle between Holocaust and Grey results in the former being stabbed with a shard of the M'Kraan Crystal—this causes an unexpected result, as it causes a backlash of energy that engulfs both Nate and Holocaust, who then vanish without a trace.

Arriving on Earth 616
It was later revealed that the M’Kraan Crystal fragment that was used against Holocaust somehow transported both Holocaust and Grey into the present time of the regular Marvel universe. Holocaust then materializes in Earth’s orbit, his containment suit shattered, with his body encased in a block of ice; the character is discovered by the Acolytes supervillain team and Exodus delivers an order to transport Holocaust's body aboard the Avalon space station. Inside Avalon, Holocaust drains the life energy of a few Acolytes to regain some of his strength after escaping his containment chamber; the character then proceeds to battle Exodus, a former X-Man whose history is remembered by Holocaust. The battle destroys the station and both characters crash to Earth, where Holocaust drains more human lives to prevent his essence from dissipating.

Holocaust is eventually found by Sebastian Shaw. Shaw and Holocaust form a short-lived and uneasy alliance, and Shaw provides Holocaust with a new containment suit. Holocaust helps Shaw to capture and brainwash the character of "X-Force", but their partnership dissolves after the plan fails.

Holocaust then encounters the psionic being Onslaught and embraces the meeting as a chance to retaliate against Grey. Holocaust willingly becomes an agent of Onslaught's "Dark Descendants" to fulfill his plan with Onslaught altering Holocaust's brain engrams that rendered him resistant to most forms of telepathic assault. His engrams were altered to such a degree that he was rendered undetectable telepathically. Coincidentally, Holocaust's first assignment under Onslaught's rule is to attack Grey. However, during the assignment, Holocaust is barely defeated and is forced to retreat; Onslaught later reveals to Holocaust that the assignment was, in fact, a test of the mettle of the X-Man. Later, when Onslaught finally launches his massive assault on the Earth city of Manhattan, Holocaust is dispatched, along with fellow Dark Descendant minions, to cause chaos in the streets of the city.

Holocaust began having difficulties with his armor and was forced to seek out assistance from the Dark Beast, another survivor from the Age of Apocalypse. While conducting experiments on Holocaust's exoskeleton, the villains were assaulted by Shi'ar shock troopers, who took them into custody. Along with Nate Grey and the Sugar Man, they learned that their bodies carried a "shimmering" of energy from the M'Kraan Crystal after passing through it, drawing some of the crystal's infinite power away. The Shi'ar considered this blasphemous and a desecration of their sacred crystal. Holocaust's crime was considered the most heinous, as he still hosted an actual fragment of the crystal from another dimension inside his armor. Holocaust and the Dark Beast were forced into an unlikely alliance with their rivals, Nate Grey and Sugar Man. As they tried to escape the Shi'ar starcraft, Holocaust couldn't resist turning on Grey and trying to kill him during their melee with the Shi'ar guards. Grey struck back by telekinetically ripping the crystal shard out of Holocaust's chest, tearing him up from the inside. As Grey pulverized the crystal, the implosion of M'Kraan energies sucked out the residual shimmering from the Age of Apocalypse refugees, cleansing them of their connection to the crystal. A surprising consequence was that Holocaust reverted into his original human appearance as Nemesis, before flipping to become Holocaust again. McCoy explained that shape-changing was always a potential feature of Holocaust's armor, but he hid the exoskeleton's true potential from the Horseman because they were rivals back in the day. Holocaust and McCoy teleported away, as the Dark Beast promised to show Nemesis all that he was capable of.

Holocaust then uses this ability to make himself look like Grey, killing more and more people until the two adversaries finally clash again. Holocaust is defeated and so much of his energy is drained that he searches out Dark Beast to repair himself.

Return to the Age of Apocalypse and death of the character
Suddenly, the character becomes unstuck in time (due to the influence of a character named "Timebroker") and returns to his birth reality, where he is told to join the Exiles. Holocaust learns that Apocalypse is dead and forgets about the time issue due to his intense focus upon claiming the throne; however, the character is distracted by the even more tempting power of the M'Kraan Crystal once again. Holocaust tracks down the M'Kraan Crystal and takes control of the army base housing it.

Holocaust believes that the Exiles' resourcefulness in time travel matters can free him from the Timebroker's influence and convinces the Exiles to join in an attack on the Timebroker. However, as the Exiles and Holocaust reach the Panoptichron—the base of the Timebroker—they instead find that the Timebroker never existed in the first place and that "Weapon X" member Hyperion is in control of the Panoptichron. Holocaust, enraged at Hyperion's intentions to enslave the son of Apocalypse, attacks the emperor, but Hyperion cracks Holocaust's exoskeleton open. The emperor then proceeds to absorb Holocaust's bioenergy into himself by literally inhaling the villain, effectively killing Holocaust.

Powers and abilities
Holocaust originally possessed the ability to absorb various forms of ambient energy, including the life energy of other beings, into himself. He could use this drained energy to fully sustain himself. As a result, he required no food, water, air or even sleep to sustain his physical and mental health. He also could use these energies to enhance his own strength and the power to generate highly destructive bio-nuclear microwave energy blasts, the latter of which enables the character to fly.

Following his evolution into an energy being, Holocaust's body is in an almost intangible state. As a result, he is virtually impervious to all forms of physical injury. However, he must continuously absorb the life energies of others in order to maintain his physical form, otherwise his essence would eventually dissipate.

In order to remain in a cohesive form without having to constantly absorb the life-force energies, he was fitted with a crystalline suit of armor that essentially acted as a highly durable containment suit. By purposely channeling the energy he had absorbed, he could charge his exoskeleton and use its unique shapeshifting abilities to take on virtually any type of humanoid form. He also could generate concentrated beams of plasma, which he often used in combat situations.

Reception
 In 2018, CBR.com ranked Holocaust 22nd in their "Age Of Apocalypse: The 30 Strongest Characters In Marvel's Coolest Alternate World" list.

Other versions

Earth-616
The Earth-616 version of Holocaust has appeared in the main reality as "Genocide" (a.k.a. "William Rolfson"), the son of Apocalypse and Autumn Rolfson. Afraid that Apocalypse would kill the child, due to a perception of threat, Autumn keeps Genocide's existence hidden with the help of the Clan Akkaba and Dark Beast.

Warren Worthington III (later known as "Archangel"), a character that has succumbed to the darkness within him and is becoming the new Apocalypse, arrives at the location where Autumm and Genocide are hidden and both join Archangel's quest. The three travel to Cavern X where they face Archangel's former teammates and half of Wolverine's body is incinerated by Genocide. Then, under Archangel's orders, Genocide wipes out a small town in the Earth location of Northern Montana.

Later, Genocide's powers are used in a device called the "Doom Fountain" that will fatally burn all of the life on Earth. The character of "Nightcrawler", from the Age of Apocalypse, then teleports Genocide out of the device and sends the character to Archangel, who is with the newly converted Death (also known as "Psylocke"). Nightcrawler then opens Genocide's helmet, thereby releasing his nuclear flame powers that can only be controlled with the aid of the containment suit. During this procedure, Archangel shields himself and Psylocke with his wings, but Ozymandias is consumed and killed by Genocide's uncontrollable outburst. Nightcrawler then teleports Psylocke to another location, while Archangel fights Genocide's nuclear flames to replace the character's helmet, before leaving Genocide in the care of Akkaba servants.

Genocide is later killed by Magneto during the Apocalypse Wars saga, who destroys his life supporting armor.

In other media

Television
 Holocaust makes a brief cameo appearance in the X-Men: The Animated Series episode "One Man's Worth".
 Holocaust was originally set to appear in Wolverine and The X-Men had the series been renewed for a second season.

Video games
 Holocaust appears as a boss in the video game X-Men Legends II: Rise of Apocalypse voiced by Peter Lurie. The character appears as a Horseman of Apocalypse based at the Madri Temple and is the protector of the Stepford Cuckoos (Holocaust refers to the Cuckoos as the "Trinity"). Holocaust then appears during the battle with the Stepford Cuckoos.

References

External links
 Holocaust at the Marvel website
 Holocaust in the "Character Glossary" of Uncannyxmen.Net
 

Characters created by Scott Lobdell
Comics characters introduced in 1995
Fictional mass murderers
Marvel Comics characters with superhuman strength
Marvel Comics mutants
Marvel Comics superheroes
Marvel Comics supervillains
X-Men supporting characters